Rasra is a city and a municipal board in Ballia district in the Indian state of Uttar Pradesh. It is one among six tehsils that come under Ballia district, Rasra is also known as 'Chhoti Kashi' and 'Nath Nagri' due to the presence of Nath Baba mandir which is a well known religious spot. In past the production of sugar from rotten sugarcanes lead to the city being named 'Rasra' which is a portmanteau word made-up of two hindi words 'Ras' (रस) meaning juice and 'Sada/Sara' (सड़ा) meaning rotten. It has an important market for the nearby villages. Lounglatta is the famous sweet of Rasra. Dussehra is one of two very prominent festivals, here, alongside Chhath . Rasra has top schools of district. Rasra has second largest Durga Puja celebration in Uttar Pradesh after Ram Nagar, Varanasi. Rasra has a busy fish market, chicken market and mutton narket. It has also Sadar Bazaar, Station Road Market, Hospital Complex Market, Mission Road Market, Kali Maa ka chaura, and This place is known for all religious cultures, and has many of mandir, churches and mosques.

Geography

Tourism place and Temple  
Sri Nath Ji Math Nagpur
Sri Nath Ji Math Nagpura
Sri Nath Ji Math Rasra
Historical Ramleela Maidan Rasra
Sri Nath Ji Math Maharajpur
Sri Nath Ji Math Kanso-Patna
Sri Kali Ji Temple Rasra
Sri Khaki Baba Temple Khanwar
Temple Bulaki das ki mathiya
Sri Brahm Ji Temple Bramsthan
Sri Lakhneswar dham (mundera)

Demographics
 India census, Rasra had a population of 29,263.

References

Cities and towns in Ballia district